Péter Abay (born 13 May 1962) is a Hungarian fencer, who won a silver medal in the team sabre competition at the 1992 Summer Olympics in Barcelona together with György Nébald, Bence Szabó, Imre Bujdosó and Csaba Köves.

Awards
 Hungarian fencer of the Year (1): 1991

Orders and special awards
   Cross of Merit of the Republic of the Hungary – Silver Cross (1992)

References

1962 births
Living people
Fencers from Budapest
Hungarian male sabre fencers
Olympic fencers of Hungary
Fencers at the 1992 Summer Olympics
Olympic silver medalists for Hungary
Olympic medalists in fencing
Medalists at the 1992 Summer Olympics